During the 1999–2000 English football season, Barnsley F.C. competed in the Football League First Division.

Season summary
Barnsley qualified for the play-offs and, after thrashing Birmingham City 5–2 on aggregate (with a 2–1 defeat at Oakwell insufficient for Birmingham to best Barnsley over two legs after the Tykes' 4–0 win at St Andrew's), reached the final at Wembley to face Ipswich Town. Barnsley took the lead through an own goal by Ipswich goalkeeper Richard Wright, but goals from Tony Mowbray, Richard Naylor and Marcus Stewart put Ipswich 3-1 up. A Craig Hignett penalty with twelve minutes left gave Barnsley hope, until Martijn Reuser's goal on the stroke of injury time. The 4–2 defeat condemned Barnsley to a second consecutive season in the First Division.

Barnsley, who were the Football League's top scorers with 88 goals, could have achieved automatic promotion, but for their poor defence that conceded 67 goals - the worst of any in the top twelve of the First Division, and joint fourth-worst in the division.

Final league table

Results
Barnsley's score comes first

Legend

Football League First Division

First Division play-offs

FA Cup

League Cup

Squad

Left club during season

Transfers

In
 Kevin Austin - Lincoln City

Notes

References

Barnsley
Barnsley F.C. seasons